Anoplognathus boisduvalii is a beetle of the family Scarabaeidae native to eastern Australia.

References

Scarabaeidae
Beetles described in 1835